Alford is a town in Berkshire County, Massachusetts, United States. It is part of the Pittsfield, Massachusetts Metropolitan Statistical Area. The population was 486 at the 2020 census.

History 
Alford was first settled in 1756 as part of a land purchase from the Shauanum Stockbridge Mahican tribe by a group led by Timothy Woodbridge. The town, originally part of Great Barrington, separated in 1769 and was officially incorporated in 1773. It was named for Colonel John Alford of Charlestown, who was known for preaching Christianity to Native Americans and for sponsoring a theology professorship at Harvard College's Divinity School. The town has been mostly agricultural throughout its existence, however in 1799, large marble deposits were found on the western slopes of Tom Ball Mountain, and for the next 90 or so years it would be an industrious mining town. This would come to an end when the railroad was laid in a neighboring valley, rendering the last operating quarries of Alford unable to compete.

Around New Year's Day, 1776, General Henry Knox passed into Massachusetts through the town, bringing cannons from Fort Ticonderoga eastward to help end the Siege of Boston. Today, this route is known as the Knox Trail, and a marker is located at the state line.

Geography
Alford lies along the western border of Berkshire County and Massachusetts, east of Columbia County, New York. The town, which is roughly shaped like an arrowhead, is bordered by West Stockbridge to the northeast, Great Barrington to the southeast, Egremont to the south, and Hillsdale and Austerlitz, New York, to the west.

Alford is surrounded by hills and mountains of the Taconic Range. The Green River, a tributary of the Housatonic River, flows through the southwest corner of town, and Alford Brook flows through the central part of town, eventually flowing into the Green River in neighboring Great Barrington. Several other brooks flow into these two waterways. To the northeast of town, Tom Ball Mountain peaks just over the town line in West Stockbridge, with its western face being somewhat marshy.

Alford is home to the western terminus of Massachusetts Route 71, a short continuation of New York State Route 71. The Knox Trail follows this route into the state, and the road heads southeastward into Egremont before ending in Great Barrington. There are no other state routes in the town, with few local roads crossing through town. The nearest rail service is at the Amtrak station in Pittsfield, with service to Boston, Chicago and New York City via a connection at Albany. Bus service is available in Pittsfield as well as in Great Barrington, provided by Peter Pan Bus Lines. There are general aviation airports in Great Barrington and Pittsfield, but the nearest airport for commercial flights is Albany International Airport in New York.

Demographics

As of the census of 2000, there were 399 people, 171 households, and 114 families residing in the town. By population, Alford ranks twenty-ninth out of the 32 cities and towns in Berkshire County, and is ninth-smallest of the 351 cities and towns in Massachusetts. There were 279 housing units at an average density of 24.1 per square mile (9.3/km2). The racial makeup of the town was 99.00% White, 0.75% African American, and 0.25% from two or more races.

There were 171 households, out of which 22.8% had children under the age of 18 living with them, 59.6% were married couples living together, 4.7% had a female householder with no husband present, and 33.3% were non-families. Of all households 29.8% were made up of individuals, and 10.5% had someone living alone who was 65 years of age or older.  The average household size was 2.33 and the average family size was 2.87.

In the town, the population was spread out, with 20.8% under the age of 18, 3.5% from 18 to 24, 18.0% from 25 to 44, 41.6% from 45 to 64, and 16.0% who were 65 years of age or older.  The median age was 50 years. For every 100 females, there were 89.1 males.  For every 100 females age 18 and over, there were 93.9 males.

The median income for a household in the town was $49,632, and the median income for a family was $62,344. Males had a median income of $47,083 versus $28,929 for females. The per capita income for the town was $40,412.  About 2.8% of families and 4.1% of the population were below the poverty line, including 5.2% of those under age 18 and 6.8% of those age 65 or over.

Government
Alford uses the open town meeting form of government, and is led by a board of selectmen. The town has its own police, fire and public works departments, but does not have its own post office (it shares the Egremont, Great Barrington, and West Stockbridge post offices). The town's library is connected to the regional library system. The nearest hospital, Fairview Hospital, is located in neighboring Great Barrington.

On the state level, Alford is represented in the Massachusetts House of Representatives by the Fourth Berkshire district, which covers southern Berkshire County, as well as the westernmost towns in Hampden County. In the Massachusetts Senate, the town is represented by the Berkshire, Hampshire and Franklin district, which includes all of Berkshire County and western Hampshire and Franklin counties. The town is patrolled by the First (Lee) Station of Barracks "B" of the Massachusetts State Police.

On the national level, Alford is represented in the United States House of Representatives as part of Massachusetts's 1st congressional district. Massachusetts is currently represented in the United States Senate by senior Senator Elizabeth Warren and junior Senator Ed Markey.

Education

Alford is part of the Mount Everett Regional School District along with Egremont, Monterey, Mount Washington, New Marlborough, and Sheffield. Students in Alford, Egremont and Mount Washington attend the Appalachian School for kindergarten and first grades, with second through sixth grades attending the Undermountain Elementary School in Sheffield, and Mount Everett Regional High School in Sheffield for grades 7–12. There are private schools in Great Barrington and other nearby towns.

The nearest community college is the South County Center of Berkshire Community College in Great Barrington. The nearest state college is Westfield State University, and the nearest University of Massachusetts is the University of Massachusetts Amherst. The nearest private college is Bard College at Simon's Rock in Great Barrington.

Notable people
 Carolyn Gold Heilbrun, mystery writer, once had a summer home in town
 John W. Hulbert (1770–1831), born in Alford, lawyer and congressman from Massachusetts

References

External links

 Town of Alford official website

 
1773 establishments in Massachusetts
Towns in Berkshire County, Massachusetts
Towns in Massachusetts